San Bernardo is the name of 2 villages in Oaxaca, Mexico.

One is located at 
One is located at

References

See also
San Bernardo Mixtepec

Populated places in Oaxaca